Bjørn Tore Kvarme (born 17 June 1972) is a Norwegian former professional football defender. Kvarme earned one cap for the Norwegian national team, a friendly against Colombia in 1997.

Career
Kvarme was born in Trondheim, Norway. He first signed with Rosenborg in 1991, transferring from Utleira, a local club. He played six seasons, winning the Tippeliga five times. In the autumn of 1996 Kvarme was on his way to sign for Stabæk, but Premier League club Liverpool outbid the Norwegian club. Kvarme spent three years on Merseyside. In 1999, he was transferred to the French club AS Saint-Étienne, where he played two seasons and became their club captain, before signing for Real Sociedad in La Liga. He spent three seasons in the Basque Country, before moving back to France, this time playing for Bastia for half a season. In 2005, he returned to his hometown club.

Bjørn Tore Kvarme announced that he would retire after the 2007 season. Stating injuries and lack of playing time as the main reasons for retiring, he did however agree to take another year with Rosenborg. Kvarme retired in June 2008, mid-season.

References

1972 births
Living people
Norwegian footballers
Norway international footballers
Norway under-21 international footballers
Rosenborg BK players
Liverpool F.C. players
AS Saint-Étienne players
La Liga players
Real Sociedad footballers
SC Bastia players
Association football central defenders
Eliteserien players
Premier League players
Ligue 1 players
Norwegian expatriate footballers
Expatriate footballers in England
Expatriate footballers in France
Expatriate footballers in Spain
Norwegian expatriate sportspeople in France
Norwegian expatriate sportspeople in Spain
Footballers from Trondheim